The 2011 Kohistan floods are a series of flash floods that took place throughout the month of August 2011 in the Kohistan District of Khyber Pakhtunkhwa in northwest Pakistan. The floods, caused by overnight heavy rains, have left at least 63 people dead and washed away dozens of houses, settlements, livestock and vegetation.

The floods were the most destructive since the deadly 2010 Pakistan floods which rampaged the whole country.

References

2011 in Pakistan
2011 floods in Asia
History of Khyber Pakhtunkhwa (1947–present)
Kohistan District, Pakistan
Floods in Pakistan
Government of Yousaf Raza Gillani
Kohistan
August 2011 events in Pakistan